Fumaria agraria is an herbaceous annual plant in the poppy family Papaveraceae. It is native to North Africa and the western Mediterranean Europe, and has been introduced to Chile, Peru, Ecuador, and northern Argentina, where it is now an invasive species.

Description
The leaves are pinnatisect. It has pink flowers with purple petal tips.

References

agraria
Plants described in 1816
Flora of Malta